Videotape is magnetic tape used for storing video and usually sound in addition. Information stored can be in the form of either an analog or digital signal. Videotape is used in both video tape recorders (VTRs) and, more commonly, videocassette recorders (VCRs) and camcorders. Videotapes have also been used for storing scientific or medical data, such as the data produced by an electrocardiogram.

Because video signals have a very high bandwidth, and stationary heads would require extremely high tape speeds, in most cases, a helical-scan video head rotates against the moving tape to record the data in two dimensions.

Tape is a linear method of storing information and thus imposes delays to access a portion of the tape that is not already against the heads. The early 2000s saw the introduction and rise to prominence of high-quality random-access video recording media such as hard disks and flash memory. Since then, videotape has been increasingly relegated to archival and similar uses.

Early formats 
The electronics division of entertainer Bing Crosby's production company, Bing Crosby Enterprises (BCE), gave the world's first demonstration of a videotape recording in Los Angeles on November 11, 1951. A year later, an improved version using one-inch (2.54 cm) magnetic tape was shown to the press, who reportedly expressed amazement at the quality of the images although they had a "persistent grainy quality that looked like a worn motion picture." Overall the picture quality was still considered inferior to the best kinescope recordings on film. Bing Crosby Enterprises hoped to have a commercial version available in 1954 but none came forth.

The BBC experimented from 1952 to 1958 with a high-speed linear videotape system called Vision Electronic Recording Apparatus (VERA), but this was ultimately dropped in favor of quadruplex videotape.

RCA demonstrated the magnetic tape recording of both black-and-white and color television programs at its Princeton laboratories on December 1, 1953. The high-speed longitudinal tape system, called Simplex, in development since 1951, could record and play back only a few minutes of a television program. The color system used half-inch (1.27 cm) tape on 10½ inch reels to record five tracks, one each for red, blue, green, synchronization, and audio. The black-and-white system used quarter-inch (0.635 cm) tape also on 10½ inch reels with two tracks, one for video and one for audio. RCA-owned NBC first used it on The Jonathan Winters Show on October 23, 1956, when a prerecorded song sequence by Dorothy Collins in color was included in the otherwise live television program.

In 1953, Dr. Norikazu Sawazaki developed a prototype helical scan video tape recorder.

BCE demonstrated a color system in February 1955 using a longitudinal recording on half-inch (1.27 cm) tape. CBS, RCA's competitor, was about to order BCE machines when Ampex introduced the superior Quadruplex system. BCE was acquired by 3M Company in 1956.

In 1959, Toshiba released the first commercial helical scan video tape recorder.

Broadcast video

Quad 

The first commercial professional broadcast quality videotape machines capable of replacing kinescopes were the two-inch quadruplex videotape (Quad) machines introduced by Ampex on April 14, 1956, at the National Association of Broadcasters convention in Chicago. Quad employed a transverse (scanning the tape across its width) four-head system on a two-inch (5.08 cm) tape and stationary heads for the soundtrack.

CBS Television first used the Ampex VRX-1000 Mark IV at its Television City studios in Hollywood on November 30, 1956, to play a delayed broadcast of Douglas Edwards and the News from New York City to the Pacific Time Zone. On January 22, 1957, the NBC Television game show Truth or Consequences, produced in Hollywood, became the first program to be broadcast in all time zones from a prerecorded videotape. 

Ampex introduced a color videotape recorder in 1958 in a cross-licensing agreement with RCA, whose engineers had developed it from an Ampex black-and-white recorder.  NBC's special, An Evening With Fred Astaire (1958), is the oldest surviving television network color videotape, and has been restored by the UCLA Film and Television Archive.

On December 7, 1963, instant replay, originally a videotape-based system, was used for the first time during the live transmission of the Army–Navy Game by its inventor, director Tony Verna.

Although Quad became the industry standard for approximately thirty years, it has drawbacks such as an inability to freeze pictures, and no picture search. Also, in early machines, a tape could reliably be played back using only the same set of hand-made tape heads, which wore out very quickly. Despite these problems, Quad is capable of producing excellent images. Subsequent videotape systems have used helical scan, where the video heads record diagonal tracks (of complete fields) onto the tape.

Many early videotape recordings were not preserved. While much less expensive (if repeatedly recycled) and more convenient than kinescope, the high cost of 3M Scotch 179 and other early videotapes ($300 per one-hour reel) meant that most broadcasters erased and reused them, and (in the United States) regarded videotape as simply a better and more cost-effective means of time-delaying broadcasts than kinescopes. It was the four time zones of the continental United States which had made the system very desirable in the first place.

Some early broadcast videotapes have survived, including The Edsel Show, broadcast live in 1957, and 1958's An Evening With Fred Astaire, the oldest color videotape of an entertainment program known to exist (and the second-oldest color videotape known to survive, the oldest being the May 1958 dedication of the WRC-TV studios in Washington, D.C.). In 1976, NBC's 50th-anniversary special included an excerpt from a 1957 color special starring Donald O'Connor; despite some obvious technical problems, the color tape was remarkably good. Some classic television programs recorded on studio videotape have been made available on DVD – among them NBC's Peter Pan (first telecast in 1960) with Mary Martin as Peter, several episodes of The Dinah Shore Chevy Show (late 1950s/early 60s), the final Howdy Doody Show (1960), the television version of Hal Holbrook's one-man show Mark Twain Tonight (first telecast in 1967), and Mikhail Baryshnikov's classic production of the ballet The Nutcracker (first telecast in 1977).

Types C and B 
The next format to gain widespread usage was 1 inch (2.54 cm) Type C videotape introduced in 1976. This format introduced features such as shuttling, various-speed playback (including slow-motion), and still framing. Although 1" Type C's quality was still quite high, the sound and picture reproduction attainable on the format were of slightly lower quality than Quad. However, compared to Quad, 1" Type C machines required much less maintenance, took up less space, and consumed much less electrical power.

In Europe, a similar tape format was developed, called 1 inch Type B videotape. Type B machines use the same 1" tape as Type C but they lacked C's shuttle and slow-motion options. The picture quality is slightly better, though. Type B was the broadcast norm in continental Europe for most of the 1980s.

Professional cassette formats 

A videocassette is a cartridge containing videotape. In 1969, Sony introduced a prototype for the first widespread video cassette, the ¾ʺ (1.905 cm) composite U-matic system, which Sony introduced commercially in September 1971 after working out industry standards with other manufacturers. Sony later refined it to Broadcast Video U-matic or BVU. Sony continued its hold on the professional market with its ever-expanding ½ʺ (1.27 cm) component video Betacam family (introduced in 1982), which, in its digital variants, is still among the professional market leaders. Panasonic had some limited success with its MII system, but never could compare to Betacam in terms of market share.

The next step was the digital revolution. Among the first digital video formats was Sony's D-1, which featured uncompressed digital component recording. Because D-1 was extremely expensive, the composite D-2 and D-3 (by Sony and Panasonic, respectively) were introduced soon after. Ampex introduced the first compressed component recording with its DCT series in 1992. Panasonic trumped D-1 with its D-5 format, which is uncompressed as well, but much more affordable.

The DV standard, which debuted in 1995, has become widely used both in its native form and in more robust forms such as Sony's DVCAM and Panasonic's DVCPRO as an acquisition and editing format. 

For camcorders, Sony adapted the Betacam system with its Digital Betacam format, later following it up with the cheaper Betacam SX and MPEG IMX formats, and the semiprofessional DV-based DVCAM system. Panasonic used its DV variant DVCPRO for all professional cameras, with the higher-end format DVCPRO50 being a direct descendant. JVC developed the competing D9/Digital-S format, which compresses video data in a way similar to DVCPRO but uses a cassette similar to S-VHS media.

High definition 
The introduction of HDTV video production necessitated a medium for storing high-definition video information. In 1997, Sony bumped its Betacam series up to HD with the HDCAM standard and its higher-end cousin HDCAM SR. Panasonic's competing format for cameras is based on DVCPRO and called DVCPRO HD. For VTR and archive use, Panasonic expanded the D-5 specification to store compressed HD streams and called it D-5 HD.

Home video

VCRs 
The first consumer videocassette recorders (VCR) were launched in 1971 (based around Sony U-matic technology). Philips entered the domestic market the following year with the N1500. Sony's Betamax (1975) and JVC's VHS (1976) created a mass-market for VCRs and the two competing systems battled the "videotape format war", which VHS ultimately won. In Europe Philips had developed the Video 2000 format, which did not find favour with the TV rental companies in the UK and lost out to VHS.

At first VCRs and videocassettes were very expensive, but by the late 1980s the price had come down enough to make them affordable to a mainstream audience. Videocassettes finally made it possible for consumers to buy or rent a complete film and watch it at home whenever they wished, rather than simply catching it at a movie theater or having to wait until it was telecast. It gave birth to video rental stores, Blockbuster the largest chain, which lasted from about 1980 to 2005. It also made it possible for a VCR owner to begin time-shifting the recording of films and other television programs straight from the transmission. This caused an enormous change in viewing practices, as one no longer had to wait for a repeat of a program that had been missed. The shift to home viewing also changed the movie industry's revenue streams, because home renting created an additional window of time in which a film could make money. In some cases, films that did only modestly in their theater releases went on to have strong performances in the rental market (e.g., cult films).

VHS became the leading consumer tape format for home movies after the "videotape format war", though its follow-ups S-VHS, W-VHS and D-VHS never caught up in popularity. In the early 2000s in the prerecorded video market, VHS began to be displaced by DVD. The DVD format has several advantages over VHS tape. A DVD is much better able to take repeated viewings than VHS tape, which can crack or break, which makes DVDs a better format from a rental store's perspective. As well, whereas a VHS tape can be erased if it is exposed to a rapidly changing magnetic field of sufficient strength, DVDs and other optical discs are not affected by magnetic fields. Even though DVDs do not have the problems of tapes, such as breakage of the tape or the cassette mechanism, DVDs can still be damaged by scratches. Another factor for movie rental stores is that DVDs are smaller and take less space to store. DVDs offer a number of advantages for the viewer: DVDs can support both standard 4x3 and widescreen 16x9 screen aspect ratios and DVDs can provide twice the video resolution of VHS. As well, a viewer who wants to skip ahead to the end of a movie can do so much faster with a DVD than with a VHS tape (which has to be rewound). DVDs can have interactive menus, multiple language tracks, audio commentaries, Closed Captioning and subtitling (with the option of turning the subtitles on or off, or selecting subtitles in several languages). Moreover, a DVD can be played on a computer.

Due to these advantages, by the mid-2000s, DVDs were the dominant form of prerecorded video movies in both the rental film and new movie markets. In the late 1990s and early 2000s, though, consumers continued to use VCRs to record over-the-air TV shows, because consumers could not make home recordings onto DVDs. This last barrier to DVD domination was broken in the late 2000s, with the advent of inexpensive DVD recorders and other digital video recorders (DVRs). DVR devices, which record shows onto a hard disk or flash storage, can be purchased from electronics stores or rented from cable or satellite TV providers. Despite the mainstream dominance of DVD, VHS continues to have a role. The conversion to DVD has led to the marketplace being flooded with used VHS films, which are available at pawnshops and second-hand stores, typically for a lower price than the equivalent film on a used DVD. As well, due to the large number of VHS players in schools and libraries, VHS tapes are still produced for the educational market.  , at least one Public Library in the Detroit, Michigan area has discontinued lending out VHS prerecorded movies. In July 2016, the last known manufacturer of VCRs, Funai, announced that it was ceasing VCR production.

Consumer and prosumer camcorders 

Early consumer camcorders used full-size VHS or Betamax cassettes. Later models switched to more compact formats, designed explicitly for smaller camcorder use, like VHS-C and Video8. VHS-C is a downsized version of VHS, using the same recording method and the same tape, but in a smaller cassette. It is possible to play VHS-C tapes in a regular VHS tape recorder by using an adapter. After Super VHS had appeared, a corresponding compact version, Super VHS-C, was released as well. Video8 is an indirect descendant of Betamax, using narrower tape and a smaller cassette. Because of its narrower tape and technical differences, it is not possible to develop an adapter from Video8 to Betamax. Video8 was later developed into Hi8, which provides better resolution similar to Super VHS.

The first consumer-level and lower-end professional (prosumer) digital video recording format, introduced in 1995, used a smaller Digital Video Cassette (DVC). The format was later renamed MiniDV to reflect the DV encoding scheme, but the tapes still carry "DVC" mark. Some later formats like DVC Pro from Panasonic reflect the original name. The DVC/MiniDV format provides broadcast-quality video and sophisticated nonlinear editing capability on consumer and some professional equipment and has been used on many films, like Danny Boyle's 28 Days Later (2001, shot on a Canon XL1) and David Lynch's Inland Empire (2006, shot on a Sony PD170)

In 1999 Sony backported the DV recording scheme to 8-mm systems, creating Digital8. By using the same cassettes as Hi8, many Digital8 camcorders were able to play analog Video8/Hi8 recordings, preserving compatibility with already recorded analog video tapes. , Digital8 camcorders have been removed from the equipment offered by Sony.

Sony introduced another camcorder cassette format called MicroMV, but consumer interest was low due to the proprietary nature of the format and limited support for anything but low-end Windows video editors, and Sony shipped the last MicroMV unit in 2005. 
In the late 2000s, MiniDV and its high-definition cousin, HDV, were the two most popular consumer/pro-sumer tape-based formats. The formats use different encoding methods, but the same cassette type.  Since 2001, when MicroMV was presented, no new tape form factors have been introduced - with HDV (High Definition Video) offering consumers a bridge on HD video on MiniDV tape.

Future of tape 

With advances in technology, videotape has moved past its original uses (original recording, editing, and broadcast playback) and is now primarily an archival medium. 
The death of tape for video recording was predicted as early as 1995, when the Avid nonlinear editing system was demonstrated storing video clips on hard disks. Yet videotape was still used extensively, especially by consumers, up until about 2004, when DVD-based camcorders became affordable at consumer level and domestic computers had large enough hard drives to store an acceptable amount of video.

Consumer camcorders have switched from being tape-based to tapeless machines that record video as computer files. Small hard disks and writable optical discs have been used, with solid-state memory such as SD cards being the current market leader. There are two primary advantages: First, copying a tape recording onto a computer or other video machine occurs in real time (e.g. a ten-minute video would take ten minutes to copy); since tapeless camcorders record video as computer-ready data files, the files can simply be copied onto a computer. Second, tapeless camcorders, and those using solid-state memory in particular, are far simpler mechanically and so are more reliable.

Despite these conveniences, tape is still used extensively with filmmakers and television networks because of its longevity, low cost, and reliability. Master copies of visual content are often stored on tape for these reasons, particularly by users who cannot afford to move to tapeless machines. Professional users such as broadcast television were still using tape heavily in the mid- to late 2000s, but tapeless formats like DVCPRO P2, XDCAM and AVCHD are gaining broader acceptance.

While live recording has migrated to solid state (Panasonic P2, Sony SR MASTER or XDCAM-EX), optical disc (Sony's XDCAM) and hard disks, the high cost of solid state and the limited shelf life of hard-disk drives make them less desirable for archival use, for which tape is still used. , some news and production camera crews still have cameras that use tape formats, even in HD.

Notes

References

External links 

 
 
 
 Tape Servicing

 
American inventions
History of television
Home video
Audiovisual introductions in 1950